Brodmann is a German surname. Notable people with the surname include:

Ines Brodmann (birth date unknown), Swiss orienteer
Korbinian Brodmann (1868–1918), German neurologist
Mario Brodmann (born 1966), Swiss former ice hockey forward
René Brodmann (born 1933), Swiss football defender

See also
Brodmann area, a region in the brain cortex
Michael L. Brodman, American gynecologist and obstetrician

German-language surnames